Víctor Manuel Fuentes Martínez (born July 2, 1978) is a former Salvadoran professional football defender.

Club career
Fuentes joined the reserves team of Salvadoran giants Águila in 1996, before making his senior debut two years later. He later had a three-year stint at Atlético Balboa and moved to FAS in 2006.

Coaching career
In December 2018, Fuentes was confirmed as new assistant coach of Carlos Romero at Águila for the Clausura 2019 tournament.

International career
Fuentes made his debut for El Salvador in a February 2003 UNCAF Nations Cup match against Nicaragua, in what proved to be the only game for his country.

References

External links
 

1978 births
Living people
People from La Unión Department
Association football defenders
Salvadoran footballers
El Salvador international footballers
C.D. Águila footballers
Atlético Balboa footballers
C.D. FAS footballers
2003 UNCAF Nations Cup players